Bird is the given name of:

 Bird Stein Gans (1868–1944), American educator involved in parent education
 Bird Sim Coler (1867–1941), American Comptroller of Greater New York
 Bird Segle McGuire (1865–1930), American politician
 Bird Smith, a scouting leader in Malaysia in the 1920s and 1930s
 Bird J. Vincent (1880–1931), American soldier and politician

See also
 Bird (surname)
 Bird (nickname)